Lupata is an administrative ward in the Busokelo District of the Mbeya Region of Tanzania. In 2016 the Tanzania National Bureau of Statistics report there were 10,018 people in the ward.

Villages / neighborhoods 
The ward has 5 villages and 22 hamlets.

 Bwibuka 
 Bwibuka
 Iponjola
 Malema
 Mbongolo
 Lupata
 Igembe
 Ipoma
 Isuba
 Kibonde
 Kituli
 Njisi
 Mpanda
 Isumba
 Kabula
 Kasangali
 Kilosi
 Mpanda
 Mpombo
 Ntapisi
 Lembuka
 Mwakipiko
 Ntapisi Kati
 Nsonso
 Bujesi
 Kikulumba
 Kikusya

References

Wards of Mbeya Region